Philip Herman Willkie (December 7, 1919 – April 10, 1974) was an American lawyer and a Republican politician from Indiana. He was the only child of Wendell Willkie, the Republican candidate for President of the United States in the election of 1940, and Edith Willkie.

Willkie was educated at Harvard University, Columbia University and Princeton University. He also graduated from the American Bankers Association Stonier Graduate School of Banking. During World War II, he served as a lieutenant in the United States Navy and was second in command under Commander Weems.

Willkie was president of the Rushville National Bank in Rushville, Indiana, a farmer and cattleman, and a businessman who served on several corporate boards. He was for three two-year terms a member of the Indiana House of Representatives from 1949 to 1955.  In 1960, Willkie ran for Indiana Superintendent of Public Instruction, but lost to the incumbent, William Earl Wilson by 0.87%.

Willkie supported allowing foreign-trained doctors the ability to practice in small-town America. He also advocated the preservation of the independence of small-town banking.

His professional and social associations included Beta Theta Pi fraternity, the Masonic lodge, Moose International, Benevolent and Protective Order of Elks, Press Club, and the Columbia Club of Indianapolis. He was an admitted to the bar in New York, Washington D.C., and Indiana.

He died by suicide on April 10, 1974.  News reports indicated that his suicide followed the early stages of an investigation of the Rushville National Bank by federal regulators.  The bank was shut down by the Office of the Comptroller of the Currency in 1992 as insolvent. He was survived by both his former wife, Rosalie Heffelfinger whom he married in 1950 and divorced in 1962, and their three sons Wendell II, Philip and Frank Willkie; and his then-current wife, Virginia Isabell, whom he married in 1965, and their two sons, Benjamin J. and David W. Willkie and a step daughter Laura Selm. Virginia died in Indianapolis at the age of 89.

References

External links

 

1919 births
1974 deaths
Indiana lawyers
Farmers from Indiana
Businesspeople from Indiana
American bankers
Republican Party members of the Indiana House of Representatives
Harvard University alumni
Columbia Law School alumni
Princeton University alumni
People from Rushville, Indiana
Military personnel from Indiana
United States Navy personnel of World War II
United States Navy officers
American politicians who committed suicide
Suicides in Indiana
20th-century American businesspeople
20th-century American politicians
American people of German descent
20th-century American lawyers